Friendly Green is the only album released by the alternative metal group Outface, most famous for being Sepultura vocalist Derrick Green's first published recording.

Track listing

"Static" - 0:28
"Abel's Brother" - 4:44
"Near Near" - 5:10
"Petals" - 6:05
"Fear Not" - 5:09
"Ink Blot" - 2:17
"Not Cut Out" - 3:23
"A Hole In The Heart" - 4:00

Credits

Simon Verde (Derrick Green) - Vocals
Charlie Bucket (Charlie Garriga, of CIV) - Guitars, Artwork and Album Photography
David Marquee - Drums
Frank Cavanagh - Bass
Production and Engineering - Don Fury

1996 albums
Albums produced by Don Fury